Pennsylvania elected its members October 10, 1826.

See also 
 1826 Pennsylvania's 2nd congressional district special election
 1826 Pennsylvania's 7th congressional district special election
 1826 Pennsylvania's 13th congressional district special election
 1826 Pennsylvania's 18th congressional district special election
 1827 Pennsylvania's 2nd congressional district special election
 1826 and 1827 United States House of Representatives elections
 List of United States representatives from Pennsylvania

References 

1826
Pennsylvania
United States House of Representatives